The Fighting Sap is a 1924 American silent Western film directed by Albert S. Rogell and starring Fred Thomson, Hazel Keener and Wilfred Lucas.

Cast
 Fred Thomson as Craig Richmond 
 Hazel Keener as Marjorie Stoddard 
 Wilfred Lucas as Charles Richmond 
 George B. Williams as Walter Stoddard 
 Frank Hagney as Nebraska Brent 
 Ralph Yearsley as Twister 
 Bob Williamson as Chicago Kid 
 Bob Fleming as Sheriff

References

External links
 

1924 films
1924 Western (genre) films
1920s English-language films
American black-and-white films
Films directed by Albert S. Rogell
Film Booking Offices of America films
Silent American Western (genre) films
1920s American films